The Walls of Arcos de la Frontera (Spanish: Murallas) are walls located in Arcos de la Frontera, Spain. It was declared Bien de Interés Cultural in 1993.

References 

Bien de Interés Cultural landmarks in the Province of Cádiz
Arcos de la Frontera